Sheila Monique Lambert (born July 21, 1980) is a retired basketball players who played in the WNBA. Born in Seattle, Washington, she was the seventh pick in the 2002 WNBA draft. She was a member of the WNBA Championship Detroit Shock in 2003.

Baylor statistics
Source

Personal life
Lambert majored in telecommunications at Baylor University. Prior to this she played for the Grayson College Lady Vikings under Bill Brock. She was an all American there. Brock then moved to Baylor as Assistant Coach.

Season Statistics

Awards and honors
 2002—Frances Pomeroy Naismith Award

Vital statistics
Position: Guard
Height: 5 ft 7 in
College: Baylor University
Team(s): Houston Comets, Detroit Shock, Charlotte Sting

References

1980 births
Living people
All-American college women's basketball players
American women's basketball players
Baylor Bears women's basketball players
Charlotte Sting players
Detroit Shock players
Houston Comets players
Junior college women's basketball players in the United States
Basketball players from Seattle